Plateau Creek is a tributary of the Colorado River, approximately  long, in Mesa County, Colorado, United States. It drains a cattle ranching valley, known as Plateau Valley, north of the Grand Mesa and east of Grand Junction.

Description
The creek rises in northeastern Mesa County, in the Grand Mesa National Forest and descends through a narrow canyon to the northwest, passing north of Vega State Park. It enters the Plateau Valley at Collbran, the largest community in the valley. It flows generally west along the north edge of the Grand Mesa uplands, past Molina. State Highway 330 follows the creek through the valley, crossing it several times. Near the junction of State Highway 330 and State Highway 65 it enters a narrow canyon for the lower , followed by State Highway 65.

See also

 List of rivers of Colorado
 List of tributaries of the Colorado River

References

External link

Rivers of Colorado
Rivers of Mesa County, Colorado
Tributaries of the Colorado River in Colorado